Dasht-e Bozorg (also Romanized as Dasht Bozorg and Dasht-ī-Būzūrg) is a village in Aghili-ye Jonubi Rural District, Aghili District, Gotvand County, Khuzestan Province, Iran. At the 2006 census, its population was 804, in 168 families.

References 

Populated places in Gotvand County